Swimming at the 12th Pan American Games took place March 12–18, 1995 in Mar del Plata, Argentina. Competition was held in a long course (50m) pool.

Results

Men's events

Women's events

Medal standings

References

External links
Results
Folha Online

 
Events at the 1995 Pan American Games
P
Swimming at the Pan American Games